Welge is a surname of German origin. Notable people with the surname include:

Andree Welge (born 1972), German darts player
Gladys Welge (1902–1976), American violinist and conductor
Julio Welge (born 1973), Politician and jurist, currently candidate for deputy mayor for the Frente de la Esperanza 2021 Political party in Surquillo, Perú

References

Surnames of German origin